Kroeber or Kröber may refer to:

 Alfred L. Kroeber (1876–1960), U.S. anthropologist
 Karl Kroeber (1926-2009), U.S. professor of literature
 Martin Kröber (born 1992), German politician for the SPD
 Otto Kröber (1882–1969), German entomologist specialising in Diptera
 Theodora Kroeber (1897–1979), U.S. writer and anthropologist
 Ursula Kroeber Le Guin (1929–2017), U.S. author, daughter of Alfred L. Kroeber